ATC may refer to:

Medicine
 Acute traumatic coagulopathy
 Anaplastic thyroid cancer, a form of thyroid cancer
 Anatomical Therapeutic Chemical Classification System, a WHO drug classification system

Organizations

Military
 Air Training Command, the predecessor to Air Education and Training Command in the United States Air Force
 Air Training Corps, United Kingdom, for cadets
 Air Transport Command, a United States Army Air Force command during World War II
 New Zealand Air Training Corps, for cadets

Education
 Academy for Technology and the Classics, a charter school in Santa Fe, New Mexico, US
 Advanced Technology College, a community college in Daytona Beach, Florida, US
 Applied Technology College, one of several campuses in the Utah College of Applied Technology system
Ambrose Treacy College, high school in Brisbane, Australia

Other organizations
 Altice (company),  Luxembourg-based multinational telecoms company by Euronext stock symbol
 American Technology Corporation, former name of LRAD Corporation, a sound technology company
 American Thermoplastic Company, a United States plastics manufacturer
 American Tobacco Campus, a former property of the American Tobacco Company in Durham, North Carolina, US
 American Tractor Corporation, a 1950 manufacturer of crawler tractors which merged into Case
American Truck Company
 American-Turkish Council, a business association promoting U.S.-Turkish relations
 Appalachian Trail Conservancy, a United States nonprofit organization
 Applied Technology Council, a nonprofit founded in 1973 which studies the effects of hazards on the built environment
 Aquarian Tabernacle Church, a Wiccan church founded in 1979
 Argentina Televisora Color, former name of the television network Televisión Pública (Canal 7)
 Atlanta Track Club, a  non-profit running organization based in Atlanta, Georgia
 Atlanta Transit Company, former rail operator in Georgia, United States
Auckland Theatre Company, professional theatre company, New Zealand
 Australian Telecommunications Corporation, formerly Australian Telecommunications Commission
 Automobile and Touring Club for United Arab Emirates, a member of the Fédération Internationale de l'Automobile

Science and technology
 Ancillary Terrestrial Component, a U.S. Federal Communications Commission-approved technique for using a network of cell-phone towers to supplement a Mobile Satellite Service
 UK Astronomy Technology Centre, based at the Royal Observatory in Edinburgh, Scotland, part of the Science and Technology Facilities Council
 Athletic Trainer Certified, a healthcare professional board certified in athletic training
 Automatic taxonomy construction, a branch of natural language processing, which applies software programs to generate taxonomical classifications from a body of texts.
 Average total cost, in economics
 Automatic tool changer, a mechanism allowing CNC machines to switch cutting tools without operator intervention.
 Alternate technical concept, in engineering and construction.
 USENIX Annual Technical Conference, an annual peer-reviewed conference
 ATC, a codon for the amino acid isoleucine

Transport
 Advanced transportation controller, a standardization effort as part of the United States Department of Transportation's Intelligent transportation system
 All-terrain cycle, a type of all-terrain vehicle
 Alvarado Transportation Center, an intermodal transit center in New Mexico
 American Truck Corporation, a USA importer and/or assembler of Tatra and Kraz trucks.
 Armored Troop Carrier (LCM), used in the Vietnam War

Aviation
 Air traffic control, a service provided to aircraft by ground-based controllers
 Air traffic controller, people who expedite and maintain a safe and orderly flow of air traffic in the global air traffic control system
 Air Tanzania Corporation, the former state-owned airline of Tanzania

Rail
 Automatic train control, a safety system for railways

Games and hobbies
 Armacham Technology Corporation, a fictional technology developer in the video game F.E.A.R.
 Artist trading cards, individual fine art miniatures
 'Any to Come', a type of conditional bet; See Glossary of bets offered by UK bookmakers

Sports 
 SV Atlétiko Tera Corá, a Bonaire football club

Other uses
 All Things Comedy, a comedy company and podcast aggregate
 All Things Considered, a news show on National Public Radio in the United States
 Against the Current (band), an American pop rock band
 Argentina Televisora Color, former name for Televisión Pública in Argentina
 A Touch of Class (band), a pop music group from Germany and the UK (1999–2003)
 Agreement on Textiles and Clothing, a World Trade Organization regulation for trade in textiles and garments
 Audio Tele-Conference
 ATC (belay device), a model of belaying device for rock climbing
 Authorization to Carry, a permit issued in Canada to carry Restricted firearms and Prohibited handguns

See also
 Adult Third Culture Kids (ATCK), adults who as children grew up in a culture other than their parents'